Shmavon G. Mangasarov (1 August 1907 – 1992) was a Soviet artist of Armenian ethnicity. He was one of the founders and members of the Azerbaijan Society of Revolutionary Art Workers. He was also a member of the "USSR Union of Artists" and was named the "Honored Artist of Azerbaijan"

Exhibitions

During life
 1928  1st Exhibition of Young Artists Organizations of Azerbaijan in Baku
 1930  1st Exhibition of Azerbaijan Revolutionary Art Workers Association (AZORRIIS)
 1931  Exhibition of Artists of Ukraine, Azerbaijan, Armenia (Moscow)
 1932  The Soviet revolution art in Philadelphia
 1940  Art Exhibition, a visit to the 20th anniversary of the establishment of Soviet power in Azerbaijan (Baku)
 1946  Exhibition of painters-veterans of the World War II in Baku
 1947  National Art Exhibition of Azerbaijani artists dedicated to the 30th anniversary of the Great October Socialist Revolution in Baku
 1949  Exhibition of new works of artists of the Republic in Baku
 1954  Republican Art Exhibition of 1954 in Baku
 1954  Exhibition of Artists of the Azerbaijan SSR and Armenian SSR (Moscow) Georgian SSR, Azerbaijan SSR И Armenian SSR (Москва)
 1955  Republican Art Exhibition of 1955 in Baku
 1957  Republican Art Exhibition dedicated to the 40th anniversary of the Great October Socialist Revolution in Baku

Posthumous 
 2001   Artists of Azerbaijan on the Volga
 2006   Palette of friends. Artists of Transcaucasia in Saratov House of National Artist Lev Gorelik (Moscow Russian Academy of Arts) 
 2009  Caucasus to visit us – from the collection of National Artist of Russia Lev G. Gorelik
 2012  Caucasian Dictionary: Land and People, Tsaritsyno Park Museum

Works in the collections
 The State Tretyakov Gallery
 State Museum of Oriental Art

References

1907 births
1992 deaths
Soviet painters
Soviet Armenians